Ending Is the Beginning: The Mitch Lucker Memorial Show is a live video album by American deathcore band Suicide Silence. It was released on CD/DVD/Blu-ray on February 18, 2014. The performance was organized in memorial of founding Suicide Silence vocalist Mitch Lucker, after his death from injuries sustained by a motorcycle accident on November 1, 2012.  The performance featured a range of guest vocalists for each of the songs, each of whom were close to Lucker in some way. The title is derived from the title of the opening track of their debut self-titled EP. In 2013, Hernan Hermida, former vocalist of All Shall Perish took over Mitch Lucker's place as a new singer for Suicide Silence. Original Suicide Silence members Rick Ash on guitar and Josh Goddard on drums made a surprise reunion to perform the first 3 songs off of the self titled EP, Destruction of a Statue which was later re-recorded in the debut studio album The Cleansing,  Distorted Thought of Addiction, and Ending Is the Beginning which was also later re-recorded in the album You Can't Stop Me, which was released in 2014. Original bass player Mike Bodkins didn't participate on the memorial show. Guitarist Mark Heylmun played bass for the first 3 songs. After which, the current line up played the rest of the songs.

The release was dedicated to late vocalist Mitch Lucker and his daughter, Kenadee Lucker.

Track listing

Credits

Suicide Silence
Mitch Lucker – lead vocals on "Engine No. 9" (recording only)
Chris Garza – rhythm guitar
Mark Heylmun – lead guitar (tracks 4–20), bass guitar on "Destruction of a Statue", "Distorted Thought of Addiction", and "Ending Is the Beginning"
Alex Lopez – drums (tracks 4–20)
Dan Kenny – bass guitar (tracks 4–20)

Additional musicians
Jonny Davy – lead vocals on "Destruction of a Statue"
Greg Wilburg – lead vocals on "Distorted Thought of Addiction"
Brook Reeves – lead vocals on "Ending Is the Beginning"
Ricky Hoover – lead vocals on "Bludgeoned to Death"
Phil Bozeman – lead vocals on "Unanswered"
Myke Terry – lead vocals on "Girl of Glass"
Danny Worsnop – lead vocals on "The Price of Beauty"
Johnny Plague – lead vocals on "No Pity for a Coward"
Cameron "Big Chocolate" Argon – lead vocals on "Disengage"
Burke Vanraalte – lead vocals on "No Time to Bleed"
Anthony Notarmaso – lead vocals on "Smoke"
Tim Lambesis – lead vocals on "Wake Up"
Hernan "Eddie" Hermida – lead vocals on "Slaves to Substance"
Austin Carlile – lead vocals on "OCD"
Chad Gray – lead vocals on "Fuck Everything"
Robb Flynn – lead vocals, acoustic guitar on "Die Young", lead guitar on "You Only Live Once"
Max Cavalera – lead vocals, lead guitar on "Roots Bloody Roots"
Randy Blythe – lead vocals on "You Only Live Once"
Josh Goddard – drums on "Destruction of a Statue", "Distorted Thought of Addiction", and "Ending Is the Beginning"
Rick Ash – lead guitar on "Destruction of a Statue", "Distorted Thought of Addiction", and "Ending Is the Beginning"
Scott Proctor – acoustic guitar on "Die Young", guitar tech

Production
Jose Mangin – host
Jerry Clubb – executive producer, production design, supervising editor
James Lynch – producer, production design
Jeremy Schott – producer, video editor, camera operator, director, editor
Zafer Ulkucu – producer
Josh Gilbert – post-production audio mixing, live audio engineering
Joseph McQueen – post-production audio mixing, live audio engineering
Daniel Abell – camera operator
Dalton Blanco – camera operator
Steven Burhoe – camera operator, director, editor
Robbie Tassaro – camera operator
Roger Timm – camera operator
Mark Weinberg – camera operator
Abe Portillo – jib operator
Corey Clark – assistant camera
Derrell Stanfield – assistant camera
Lizzy Gonzalez – backstage videography, photography, camera operator
Evan Meszaros – live audio engineering
John Montes – live audio engineering
Adam Elmakias – photography
Sonny Guillen – photography
Jerry John Nicholl – photography
Scott Snyder – lighting
Jim Destefano – visuals
DJ Big Wiz – visuals
Ben Lionetti – technician
Trent Lopez – technician
Kevin Martin – technician
Aubin A Sadiki - Cover Art

Chelsea Chase – artist coordinator
Carlee Lowe – artist coordinator
Andy Serrao – promoter
Noah Russel – backstage management
Rob Mirhadi – merchandise
Megan Moore – merchandise
Joe Potenti – merchandise
Bailey Schrock – merchandise
Chelsie Smith – merchandise
Cody Swift – merchandise
Stephanie Fiorse – will call
Sarah Latis – production assistant
Mike Ramsey – production assistant

References

Century Media Records albums
Suicide Silence video albums
2014 video albums